"Production and Decay of Strange Particles" is an episode of the original The Outer Limits television show. It first aired on 20 April 1964, during the first season.

In a nuclear research plant, although the workers wear radiation suits, they are taken over by some odd glowing substance.  It fills their suits and causes them to act like puppets.

The episode mentions many modern physics concepts such as neutrinos, antimatter, quasi-stellar objects (at that time just discovered and perhaps mentioned here in TV fiction for the first time) and subatomic particles with the property of "strangeness" (a quantum property of matter which had been named only a few years before by physicists, despite objection at the time that it was no more "strange" or odd than any other property of subatomic particles). The episode name echoes a Physical Review paper of 1956, titled "Cloud-Chamber Study of the Production and Decay of Strange Particles."

Opening narration
In recent years, nuclear physicists have discovered a strange world of subatomic particles, fragments of atoms smaller than the imagination can picture, fragments of materials which do not obey the laws of gravity. Antimatter composed of inside-out material; shadow-matter that can penetrate ten miles of lead shielding. Hidden deep in the heart of strange new elements are secrets beyond human understanding – new powers, new dimensions, worlds within worlds, unknown.

Plot
A well-crafted riff on Frankenstein.  While experimenting on subatomic particles, physics researchers start a chain reaction that seemingly controls the researchers themselves. Scientist after scientist is consumed, turned into nuclear 'zombies' by what seems to be a form of sentient particle from another dimension.  The reaction grows towards a terrible climax.  The survivors fear they may be powerless to stop it. Just as the ever-expanding particles are about to engulf the lab and explode into an atomic cataclysm that could destroy the world, the head of the research facility calculates a formula that reverses the effects of the reaction, incorporates a random element, and neutralizes the new lifeform.

Closing narration
As Man explores the secrets of the universe, strange and inscrutable powers await him. And whether these powers are to become forces of destruction or forces of construction will ultimately depend upon simple but profound human qualities: Inspiration. Integrity. Courage.

Cast

References

External links

The Outer Limits (1963 TV series season 1) episodes
1964 American television episodes
Physics in fiction